Henri de Montaut (1825 or 1830 – 1890  or 1900 ) was a French draftsman, engraver, and illustrator of the 19th century. He sometimes signed Henri de Hem, Monta or Hy.

Career 

Henri de Montaut, with other artists such as Édouard Riou or George Roux, is remembered for the illustrations they made for the novels of the series Voyages extraordinaires by Jules Verne.

He collaborated with Le Journal illustré for which he was chief editor for a time  as well as with La Vie Parisienne.

In 1883, he became chief editor of L'Art et la mode, journal de la vie mondaine.

References 

 

French engravers
French illustrators
French draughtsmen
Year of birth uncertain
Year of death uncertain
Jules Verne